The Department of International Development (DID) is an inter-disciplinary development department located within the Faculty of Social Science and Public Policy in the school of Global Affairs at King's College London. DID was launched in 2013 with a focus on the phenomena faced by middle-income developing countries. Its research revolves around development theory, political economy, economics, geography, and social policy.

DID has students from 50 countries worldwide, who make half of all the student body. The department is a member of European Association of Development Research and Training Institutes. It has strong links with the Department for International Development, British Academy, Oxfam and UNDP, while its staff holds associate positions at Harvard University, UC Berkeley, Center for Global Development and the Institute of Development Studies. King's College London is ranked as one of the top 10 global development learning programs in the UK by QS University Ranking.

Structure 
DID is a department focusing on middle income developing countries or ‘emerging economies’ with close connections to King's College London's Global Institutes who are also housed in the School of Global Affairs, offering programmes at undergraduate and graduate level.

Notable academic staff
Andy Sumner

Research 
DID is distinctive for its interest in rising middle income developing countries (like the BRICs) as well as in social, political, and economic phenomena in conjunction with policy related questions of those fast-growing developing countries. The department’s mission is “to explore the sources of success in emerging economies as well as understand the major development challenges they continue to face”.

DID’s areas of research are ‘inclusive development’ on the one hand and ‘national development’ on the other hand. Within these two broad themes, it works on five research clusters:

 Political Institutions in Emerging Economies
 Poverty, Inequality and the New Middle Classes in Emerging Economies
 Natural Resources and Emerging Economies
 Gender Relations in Emerging Economies
 Private Sector Development in Emerging Economies

DID publishes a working paper series and has links to various external organisations including institutions like the UK Foreign Office and the UK Department for International Development, the British Academy, the European Association of Development Institutes, the UK Development Studies Association, the US Council on Foreign Relations, UNDP, the United Nations University, the WHO, the World Bank, and various international non-governmental and research organisations.

Publications 

 The Handbook of Latin American Politics : Co-edited with Deborah Yashar. London: Routledge Press, 2012
 Democratic Brazil Revisited. Co-edited with Timothy J. Power. Pittsburgh: University of Pittsburgh Press, 2008.
 Human Rights and the Millennium Development Goals : Edited by Malcolm Langford (Oslo), with Alicia Ely Yamin (Harvard), 2013
 The Future of Foreign Aid: Development Cooperation and the New Geography of Global Poverty: with Richard Mallett. Basingstoke: Palgrave Macmillan, 2012
 Intersecting Inequalities. Women and Social Policy in Peru 1990-2000. Penn State University Press, 2010.
 Sexual Violence During War and Peace. Gender, Power and Postconflict Justice in Peru. Palgrave Studies of the Americas Series, 2014.
 Operating in Emerging Markets: A Guide to Management and Strategy in the New International Economy, FT Press, 2013.
 Promoting Silicon Valleys in Latin America: lessons from Costa Rica, Routledge 2012
 Contesting Epidemics : How Brazil outpaced the United States in its Policy Response, what the BRICS can learn, and the Politics of Global Health Diplomacy, Imperial College Press, 2015
 Decentralization in Asia and Latin America: Towards a Comparative Inter-Disciplinary Perspective , with George Peterson (eds), Edward Elgar Press, 2006
 Informal Coalitions and Policymaking in Latin America. Routledge: New York, 2009
 Debates on the Measurement of Global Poverty, with Sudhir Anand, and Joseph E. Stiglitz, Oxford University Press, 2010

Academics 

The Department of International Development currently offers the following programmes:
 BA International Development
 MSc Emerging Economies and International Development
 MSc Political Economy of Emerging Markets
 MPhil/PhD Development Studies with reference to Emerging Markets

See also 

 Development studies
 Emerging economies
 Development theory
 Developing countries
 Political Economy
 Inclusive growth
 Institutional Economics
 Economic History

References 

2013 establishments in the United Kingdom
Economic research institutes
Departments of King's College London
Poverty-related organizations
Research institutes established in 2013